The 2015 Women's Pan American Challenge was the second edition of the Women's Pan American Challenge. It was held between 3 and 11 October 2015 in Chiclayo, Peru, simultaneously with the men's tournament.

Brazil won the tournament for the first time by defeating Barbados 3–1 in the final. Peru won the bronze medal by defeating Puerto Rico 2–1 in the third place playoff.

Participating nations
A total of five teams competed for the title:

 (host nation)

Results

Pool matches

Classification matches

Third to fifth place classification

Crossover

Third and fourth place

Final

Statistics

Final standings

See also
2015 Men's Pan American Challenge

References

Pan American Challenge
International women's field hockey competitions hosted by Peru
Pan American Challenge Women
Women's Pan American Challenge
Chiclayo
Pan American Challenge Women